Giannina María Lattanzio Flores (born 19 May 1993) is an Italian-born Ecuadorian footballer who plays as a forward for Superliga Femenina club CD Cuenca and the Ecuador women's national team. She was part of the Ecuadorian squad for the 2015 FIFA Women's World Cup.

References

External links
 
 

1993 births
Living people
People with acquired Ecuadorian citizenship
Ecuadorian women's footballers
Women's association football forwards
L.D.U. Quito Femenino players
C.D. Cuenca Femenino players
Women's Premier Soccer League players
Ecuador women's international footballers
2015 FIFA Women's World Cup players
Pan American Games competitors for Ecuador
Footballers at the 2015 Pan American Games
Ecuadorian expatriate footballers
Ecuadorian expatriate sportspeople in the United States
Expatriate women's soccer players in the United States
Ecuadorian expatriate sportspeople in Spain
Expatriate women's footballers in Spain
Ecuadorian people of Italian descent
Sportspeople of Italian descent
Footballers from Milan
Italian women's footballers
Italian expatriate footballers
Italian expatriate sportspeople in the United States
Italian expatriate sportspeople in Spain
Italian people of Ecuadorian descent
Sportspeople of Ecuadorian descent
21st-century Ecuadorian women